Michael Towne Sarin (born September 20, 1965, Stockton, California) is an American jazz drummer.

Sarin moved to the Puget Sound area as a child, where he began studying percussion as a teenager. He studied music at the University of Washington and Cornish College of the Arts in the mid-1980s. He played early in his career with Brad Schoeppach, then moved to New York City, where he worked extensively with Thomas Chapin and Dave Douglas. He has also played with Anthony Coleman, Ben Goldberg, Mark Helias, Myra Melford, Ned Rothenberg, and John Zorn.

Discography

With Dave Douglas
Five (Soul Note, 1996)
Convergence (Arabesque, 1999)
Witness (RCA, 2001)
With Myra Melford
The Same River, Twice (Gramavision, 1996)
Above Blue (Arabesque, 1999)

References
Steve Smith, "Michael Sarin". The New Grove Dictionary of Jazz. 2nd edition, ed. Barry Kernfeld.

American jazz drummers
Jazz musicians from California
Musicians from Stockton, California
1955 births
Living people
20th-century American drummers
American male drummers
20th-century American male musicians
American male jazz musicians